A video sensor (also video-sensor or videosensors) describes a technique of digital image analysis. A video sensor is application software, which interprets images. Video sensors use programmable algorithms running on a computer.

Video sensors are used to evaluate scenes recorded by a video camera. Objects and their characteristics (size and speed for example) are verified and compared to the pre-set examples or templates. When there is a match between object and model, then the frame and the objects are marked digitally. The operator can recall the digital marked images for further use.

Video sensors are mostly deployed with video surveillance (CCTV) systems. The commercial use of video sensors is increasing. Two main applications are  electronic security and  market research.

References

Film and video technology